Dimethyldithiocarbamate is the organosulfur anion with the formula (CH3)2NCS2−. It is one of the simplest organic dithiocarbamate.

Uses
It is a component of various pesticides and rubber chemicals in the form of its salts sodium dimethyldithiocarbamate, and potassium dimethyldithiocarbamate) as well as its complexes zinc dimethyldithiocarbamate, ferric dimethyldithiocarbamate, and nickel bis(dimethyldithiocarbamate).  Oxidation gives thiram.

References 

Dithiocarbamates
Pesticides